James Brown (born 19 February 1990) is an Australian soccer player who currently plays for National Premier Leagues club Hume City FC. At youth level, he played for the Australia national under-23 soccer team. He has 82 caps in the A-League with Gold Coast United, Newcastle Jets and Melbourne City between 2008 and 2016. He is Indigenous Australian.

Club career
From the Australian Institute of Sport (AIS), James Brown originally began his football career in the Tweed Heads region of N.S.W. Australia, with Bilambil F.C. and then Kingscliff Soccer Club, before moving on to play for Burleigh Heads on the Gold Coast. After being scouted by several representative teams, and playing football with the Gold Coast Representative Side and an Australia Selection at the Under 13 National Championships, Brown came through the ranks of the QAS, and was then signed by the AIS in 2007. A terrific start to the Victorian Premier League season in 2007 saw Brown rise through the ranks at the AIS and become a regular starter and key player for them. Brown scored 4 goals in 22 games, playing alongside the likes of Luke De Vere, Kofi Danning, James Holland and Daniel Mullen. As the season came to a close, Brown was found to have developed the Osteitis pubis condition, which has limited his footballing over the past 12 months.

Gold Coast United
On 9 December 2008 Brown was signed to a three-year deal by Gold Coast United. On 2 June 2009 Brown broke his right fibula in training, sidelining him for 8 weeks. On 13 January 2010 Brown scored his first senior goal in a 2–0 win over the Newcastle Jets at Skilled Park from a beautiful one-two with captain Jason Culina. In the 2011 season debut, Brown scored a stunning late equalizer in a 1–1 draw with Wellington Phoenix, the goal was voted goal of the week. In the second game of the season, Brown scored another terrific goal in a 1–1 draw against the Central Coast Mariners. In Round 4, Brown scored in a 3–1 win over the Newcastle Jets. In Round 6, Brown scored a goal from a heavy deflection in a 2–1 away defeat to Adelaide United. Brown was subsequently voted October's young player of the month.

Newcastle Jets
On 15 February 2012 it was announced he had signed a two-year contract with A-League club Newcastle Jets starting at the beginning of the 2012–13 A-League season.

Melbourne City
On 20 May 2014 it was announced that Brown joined Melbourne City alongside two other youth players, Connor Chapman and Jacob Melling. He scored his first goal in the 70th minute against Sydney FC to boost the team's finals hopes On 28 April 2016, Brown was released by Melbourne City.

Avondale
On 19 May 2016, Brown joined National Premier League club Avondale, but departed the club after a month.

Cape Town City
In August 2016, Brown joined newly formed South African Premier Division side Cape Town City. Brown parted ways with the club in October 2016, after only 3 appearances.

Nunawading City
In early 2017, it was announced Brown had signed for NPL Victoria side, Nunawading City FC. Brown scored on debut against the Eastern Lions in Round 1 of the 2017 season.

Career statistics

Honours

Country
Australia
 AFF U19 Youth Championship: 2008

References

External links
 

1990 births
Living people
Australian soccer players
Indigenous Australian soccer players
Gold Coast United FC players
Newcastle Jets FC players
A-League Men players
Australian Institute of Sport soccer players
Association football midfielders
Melbourne City FC players
Avondale FC players
Cape Town City F.C. (2016) players
Victorian Premier League players
Australia under-20 international soccer players
Australian expatriate soccer players
Australian expatriate sportspeople in South Africa
Expatriate soccer players in South Africa